Lisa Raymond and Rennae Stubbs defeated Cara Black and Elena Likhovtseva in the final, 7–5, 3–6, 6–3 to win the doubles tennis title at the 2001 WTA Tour Championships.

Martina Hingis and Anna Kournikova were the two-time reigning champions, but did not participate this year.

Seeds

Draw

Draw

References

Doubles
2001 WTA Tour